Mukhtar Omarkhanuli Auezov (Мұхтар Омарханұлы Әуезов, مۇحتار ومارحانۇلى اۋەزوۆ, ; , Mukhtar Omarkhanovich Auezov) (September 28, 1897 — June 27, 1961) was a Kazakh writer, a social activist, a Doctor of Philology, and an honored academic of the Soviet Union (1946). He was born on September 28, 1897 and raised in Semey (Kaskabulak).

Auezov's writings were influenced by the poet Abai. Mukhtar's father and grandfather Omarkhan Auez both highly revered the poet, who was a neighbour and a friend of the Auezov family. His grandfather was a storyteller of folk tales, and taught his grandson to read and write.

Life and family 
Auezov was born in a nomadic Muslim family from an area known today as Abay District, in East Kazakhstan Province. His grandfather taught him how to read and write using both the Arabic and Cyrillic script for the Kazakh language. Auezov was educated at the Semipalatinsk Teacher's Seminary and Leningrad State University.

Auezov is best known for his plays. The first play he authored was Enlik-Kebek, a story of two young lovers that resembles the story of Romeo and Juliet. He authored more than twenty plays that dealt with the issues relevant to Socialism in Kazakhstan.

After writing plays, Auezov changed his focus to writing novels. Two novels – Abay and The Path of Abay – dealing with the life of Kazakh poet Abai Qunanbaiuly were the product of the last twenty years of his life.

Auezov's other projects included drawing and translating literature into the Kazakh language. Some translations made by him include Nikolai Gogol's The Government Inspector and Shakespeare's The Taming of the Shrew.

Mukhtar first studied in Kaskabulak, then later a Muslim madrasa in Semipalatinsk. At age of eleven, he moved to a nearby, five-year grammar school. His father Omarkhan died in 1900, and his mother Nurzhamal in 1912. The young Mukhtar was raised by his uncle Kasymbek and his grandfather Auez and grandmother Dinas. In 1907, after a year of study in the madrasa, he was sent to the large Russian school in Semipalatinsk.

Mukhtar Auezov attended the Semipalatinsk Pedagogical Seminary after graduating from the City College. In the 1912–1913 academic year, Mukhtar finished the first seminary class with an award and went on to complete his studies at the Semipalatinsk Seminary in 1919. Around this time he began his acquaintance with Russian and other foreign classics of literature. At the same time, Auezov wrote short stories, poems and articles that began to be published.

"The young Auezov, according to the testimonies of the pedagogues, was marked for his impeccable attention, extraordinary gifts, slim build and aristocratic self-belief. He was an extraordinary sportsman and represented “Yarysh F C”, which at the time was the best football team in the city."

Mukhtar Auezov joined the faculty of a large state school, and he also worked holding various positions in the local government in Semipalatinsk with the Kazakh Central Executive Committee and in Orenburg.

In the summer of 1917, Auezov married a 15-year-old girl named Raihan. They had a daughter together in 1918 who they named Mugamilya (she lived until 2009), and a year later, in 1919, a son (who died in infancy). They got divorced in 1920.

In 1928 Mukhtar Auezov graduated from the Philological Faculty of Leningrad State University and completed his PhD at the University of Tashkent. During the 1930s, his endeavors as a professional writer began to take off. Mukhtar Auezov died during an operation in Moscow on 27 June 1961. He was buried in the Central Cemetery, Almaty. On his grave there stands a bust created by Yevgeny Vuchetich.

After his death in 1961, the Government of the Republic Kazakhstan decided to perpetuate the name of the writer. The Institute of Literature and Art of the Academy of Sciences was renamed as the Auezov Institute of Literature and Art of the Academy of Sciences. The Kazakh State Academic Drama Theatre, the Auezov Home Museum, a school, a street and an urban area in Almaty also bear his name. Also the M. O. Auezov South Kazakhstan State University in Shymkent was named after him. 

On July 21, 2022, President of Kazakhstan Kassym-Jomart Tokayev unveiled a bust of Mukhtar Auezov in Kyrgyzstan.

A selection of his stories were translated by Simon Hollingsworth and Simon Geoghegan and collected in Beauty in Mourning and Other Stories, published by Qazaq Pen Club.

Writings 

Auezov wrote numerous essays, short stories, and plays (many translated into other languages) in different genres.

In 1917, while he was studying at the seminary, he wrote “Enilik-Kebek" (a play based on folk legends). The "Enilik-Kebek" play and the story "Korgansyzdyn Kuni", which was written in 1921 demonstrated to the world his great talent as a writer. 
From 1923 he began to devote all his energy to the literary arts and to work productively. In the period 1923–1926 he authored stories such as "Okygan azamat", "Kyr suretteri", "Uilenu", "Eskilik kolenkesinde", "Kinamshil boizhetken", "Karaly sulu".

During the period 1923–1928 years he studied and then graduated from Leningrad University in the Faculty of Language and Literature. During the last two years of his studies in Leningrad, he wrote two highly acclaimed novels: "Karash-karash" and "Kokserek".

Auezov began working in depth with themes of Kazakh history. His fixation with history is demonstrated in his works "Enilik-Kebek", "Khan Kene", "Kily zmaan", "Aiman – Sholpan", and "Karakypshak Kobylandy." For 20 years he devoted himself to prose and plays, which have become classics of Kazakh literature. In the thirties, he wrote a series of stories, such as: "Kasennin kubylystary", "Izder", "Shatkalan", "Kum men Askar", "Burtkiwi", and plays like" Aiman-Sholpan", "Tas tilek", "Shekarada", "Tungi saryn".

In 1936 he published a piece of prose called "Tatiananyn kyrdagy ani" in the Kazakh press "Kazak adebieti", that was a section from the future novel of the same name. Some years after that(around 1940), with the cooperation of Leonid Sobolev, he wrote the "Abai" tragedy. The great scientist and teacher, Auezov, worked on the history of Kazakhs literature, and the training of personnel. He was the founder of the Abai studies and the principal author and editor of the multivolume "Kazak adebiet Tarihy". He also wrote a monograph on the Kyrgyz epic Manas.

After the Abai Joly epic, he began writing a new, large-scale epic that described a new era in the future. His first book of that period is called "Osken orken" and was first published posthumously in 1962. A period of blooming of Kazakh drama is associated with the works of Auezov. He wrote over twenty plays and translated such classic works of world and Russian drama as The Inspector by Gogol, Othello and The Taming of the Shrew by Shakespeare, Aristocrats by Nikolai Pogodin, Spring Love by Konstantin Trenyov, and Officer of the Navy by A. Kron.

In 1960, together with a group of Soviet writers, he visited the United States. In the summer of 1960, he started work on the series of essays named “The American Impressions”. From mid-summer 1960, he began work on the novel named “The Young Tribe”. In March 1961, Auezov embarked on a visit to India that included participation in the work of the III International Congress for Peace in Delhi together with a delegation headed by Nikolai Tikhonov. In June of that same year, he planned to visit England, the land of Shakespeare, but his untimely death meant that his wish to travel to England did not occur. On June 3, 1961, he traveled to Moscow for medical tests. On June 27, 1961 – his heart failed during a surgical operation.

"Abai Zholy" (The path of Abai) 

In his formative years, Mukhtar listened to the memories of his grandfather that told of Abai and Kunanbay. The destiny of Mukhtar Auezov was linked by many threads to the life of Abai the hero great inspiration of his life. Abai himself graced family celebrations, arranged for Auez to mark the birth of his grandson. Nurganym, one of the wives of Kunanbai father of Abai, was the sister of Auez.

Mukhtar later became friends with the son of Abai Turagulom and married Camille, granddaughter of the great poet, that is the daughter of Magauov. Auezov met Dilda, the first wife of Abai with whom he received a great deal of information. More information about Abai was forthcoming from Eigerim another of Abai’s life partners who survived her husband for more than a decade.

Mukhtar Omarhanuly for 15 years wrote his famous four-volume epic historical novel called "Abai Joly". It was translated into Russian. In 1949 two books of the novel "Abai" received the first level award of the Union of Soviet Socialist Republics. This epic, which ended with four books, was awarded the Lenin Prize. was translated into 30 languages, and received rave reviews from readers all over the world.

"Abai Zholy" is one of the most popular and valuable novels written by Mukhtar Auezov. The first book of the series was published in 1942 and after five years in 1947 “Abai”, the second of the series was published, then came the third book in 1952 called “Abai aga” (Brother Abai). Finally, the fourth book was released in 1956. Later all of the books were repackaged and renamed as “Abai zholy” (The Path of Abai). The first book and second books each have 7 chapters and one epilogue. The third book has 6 chapters as has the Fourth and one epilogue entire epic is divided into 20 short chapters each of which includes uniquely interesting situations.

Each chapter’s name precisely demonstrates the psychological state of the events within the story. If we compare there is much more drama, tragedy, sadness and sorrow than positive and happy moments. In the first book we can clearly see how the young and inexperienced boy grows up and at the end of the fourth book we see how he became an adult and changed and who ultimately fails.

Mukhtar Auezov wrote the libretto of the opera Abai.

Filmography 
 "Raihan" – 1940, Film of 8 parts. Studio, "Thumbnail". Screenplay: M. Auezov; Director: M.Levin.; Operator: H.Nazaryants Cast: E.Omirzakov, D.Bokeeva, S.Kozhamkulov.
 "Abai әnderі" – 1945. Film in 10 parts. Studio "Kazakhfilm". Screenplay: M.Auezov, G. Roshal.; Director: G.Roshal; Operator: G.Pyshkova; Artist: K.Hodzhikov; Cast: K.Kuanyshpaev, K.Badyrov, Sh.Aymanov, S.Kozhamkulov.
 "Shyndagy Shynar" – 1966. Film in 10 parts. Studio "Kazakhfilm". Screenplay: K.Muhamedzhanov; Director: S.Hodzhikov; Operator: A.Ashrapov; Cast: S.Panov, G.Adilova, N.Zhanturin, Y.Nogaybaev.
 "Caras-Caras" – 1969. Studio "Kazakhfilm" zhane "Kyrғyzfilm". Screenplay: Akim Tarazi; Director: B.Shamshiev; Cast: S.Chokmorov, S.Zhumadylov, M.Ryskulov, B.Kydykeeva
 "Kokserek" – 1973. Studio "Kazakhfilm". Screenplay: A.Mihalkov-Konchalovsky, E.Tropinin; Director: T.Okeev; Operator: K.Kydyraliev ;Cast: S.Chokmorov, K.Ualiev, K. Sataev
 "Caral sulu" – 1982.Studio "Kazakhfilm". Writer, director: E.Shynarbaev; Cast: N.Arynbasarova, N.Zhanturin
 "Abai" 1995. Studio "Kazakhfilm". Screenplay: A.Amirkulov, L.Ahynzhanova, A.Baranov, S.Aprymov; Director: A.Amirkulov.; Operator: A. Suleev. Composer: Kuat Shildebaev; Cast: G.Turykbaev, T.Zhamankulov, B.Rimova, F.Zhantileuova

Awards 

1945 – Medal "For Valiant Labour in the Great Patriotic War 1941–1945"
1948 –The Medal "In Memory of the 800th Anniversary of Moscow"
1949 – Order of the Badge of Honour
1955, 1959 – deputy of the Supreme Soviet of the Kazakh SSR
1957 – The title "The Honored Figure of Science of the Kazakh SSR"
1959 – The Lenin Prize for the novel-dialogue The Way of Abai.

Diplomas and certificates 

1946 – The Diploma of Doctor of Science (the scientific degree of doctor of science (philology)
1946 – The Certificate of Professor (Professor at the Chair of “Kazakh literature”)
1946 – The Member of the Academy of Sciences of the Kazakh SSR.
1953 – The Certificate of Professor of the Moscow State University after M.V.Lomonosov.

References

External links

Almaty Expatriate Site Biography of Auezov
Authors' Corner Biography of Auezov
Site Biography of Auezov

1897 births
1961 deaths
20th-century dramatists and playwrights
20th-century male writers
20th-century novelists
20th-century short story writers
People from Abay District, East Kazakhstan
People from Semipalatinsk Oblast
Stalin Prize winners
Lenin Prize winners
Recipients of the Order of Lenin
Recipients of the Order of the Red Banner of Labour
Kazakh-language writers
Opera librettists
Kazakhstani male writers
Kazakhstani dramatists and playwrights
Kazakhstani short story writers
Soviet male writers
Male dramatists and playwrights
Male short story writers
Soviet dramatists and playwrights
Soviet short story writers
Kazakhstani novelists
Soviet novelists
Male novelists